Rowand is a surname. Notable people with the surname include:

 Aaron Rowand (born 1977), baseball player
 James Rowand (1830–1897), farmer and political figure
 John Rowand (c. 1787–1854), fur trader
 Robert Rowand Anderson (1834–1921), Scottish Victorian architect